The Cathedral of Our Lady Also Church of Our Lady Is the Catholic cathedral of the city of Tromsø, Norway, and seat of the prelature of the same name.  It is the northernmost Catholic (and Christian in general) cathedral in the world. It is located on the Erling Bangsunds square.

Description
It is a small wooden church with room for about 150 seats. It was begun the same year as the Lutheran Cathedral of the city, in 1861 and shares with it the neogothic artistic style. It also has three small towers on the main facade and a larger tower over the choir. While the exterior has remained virtually unchanged since 1861, the interior has been modified on more than one occasion; Now the interior is simple and painted in light colors, as was the wish of Bishop Gerhard Goebel, vicar of Tromsø in the 1970s.

Next to the church is the parochial house, which was until 1967 the Catholic school of Tromsø. Currently there are celebrations and social gatherings of the Catholic community. In the square known as Stortorget is the episcopal house, an empire style building from 1832, where Pope John Paul II spent the night during his visit to Tromsø in June 1989.

See also
Roman Catholicism in Norway
Our Lady

References

Roman Catholic cathedrals in Norway
Churches in Tromsø
Roman Catholic churches completed in 1861
19th-century Roman Catholic church buildings in Norway